Olley v Marlborough Court Hotel [1949] 1 KB 532 is an English contract law case on exclusion clauses in contract law. The case stood for the proposition that a representation made by one party cannot become a term of a contract if made after the agreement was made. The representation can only be binding where it was made at the time the contract was formed.

Facts
Mrs Olley was a long-staying resident of the Marlborough Court Hotel, Lancaster Gate, London. As usual she left her room key on a rack behind the reception one day, but when she came back it was gone. Inside her room, her fur coat had been stolen.

A witness called Colonel Crerer, who was sitting in the lounge, saw a person go in and come out again with a parcel fifteen minutes later. The porter had apparently been cleaning a bust of the Duke of Marlborough and failed to notice.

Mrs Olley asked to be repaid for the cost of the coat. The hotel pointed to an exclusion clause on a notice behind a door in the bedroom leading to a washbasin, which said,

Mrs Olley argued that the clause was not incorporated into the contract.

Judgment
Denning LJ, Singleton LJ and Bucknill LJ found, firstly, that the hotel had failed to take reasonable care as they were required to do contractually and under Innkeepers' Liability Act 1863 section 1.

Secondly, the disclaimer was not part of the contract and the hotel could not rely upon it. The contract for the storage of the coat was formed at the reception desk. There was no way that Mrs Olley could have been aware of the disclaimer at that point and so it could not be part of the contract.

See also
Parker v South Eastern Railway Company

Lord Denning cases
English incorporation case law
1949 in British law
Court of Appeal (England and Wales) cases
1949 in case law